Kumari Pennin Ullathile is a 2010 Indian Tamil language romantic thriller film directed by S. Kishore. The film stars Chandrahassan Jayaprakash, newcomer Sippy and S. Kishore, with Nassar, Ajay Rathnam, Meera Vasudevan, Babilona, Ponnambalam, Senthil and Aarthi playing supporting roles. The film had musical score by Amudha Bharathi and was released on 5 March 2010.

Plot

The film begins with an unconscious and wounded Kannan (Chandrahassan Jayaprakash) at the Suryalanka Beach being saved by a young woman.

In the past, Kannan was a twelfth grade student, he lived with his mother Lakshmi (Babilona) and his stepfather Karthikeyan (Ajay Rathnam) he couldn't stand. Kannan fell in love with his collegemate Priya (Sippy) who was an orphan and also a housemaid. Paramasivam (S. Kishore), a corrupt police officer and an encounter specialist, formed his own kangaroo court and had a strong link with criminals. He then got transferred to Chennai and returned home to his family: his wife Sumithra (Meera Vasudevan) and his little son. Paramasivam fell under the spell of the young Priya who lived with them. One night, he tried to rape Priya in his house but she managed to escape. Priya bumped into Kannan and Kannan brutally wounded Paramasivam in his left eye. Paramasivam's henchmen then attacked Kannan and the lovers got separated.

Back to the present, Kannan finally finds Priya in a remote place. Without a place to stay and without money, they are accommodated by an old couple (Nassar and Seetha) who had lost their only daughter many years ago. Meanwhile, an enraged Paramasivam, who had lost sight in his left eye, tracks them down in a remote forest. Paramasivam pushes Kannan off a cliff and he forcefully rapes Priya. A vengeful Priya then plucks out Paramasivam's right eye thus killing him. Kannan who survived the fall returns to his lover.

Cast
 
Chandrahassan Jayaprakash as Kannan
Sippy as Priya
S. Kishore as Paramasivam
Nassar
Ajay Rathnam as Karthikeyan
Meera Vasudevan as Sumithra
Seetha as Saradha
Babilona as Lakshmi
Ponnambalam as Saravanan
Senthil as Constable
Aarthi as Maya
Kadhal Sukumar as Karuppu
Pandu as Constable
Senthilnathan as P. E. T. master
Kumarimuthu as Beggar
Muthukaalai as Constable
Kovai Senthil
Kullamani
Risha as Rani
Laksha in a special appearance
Jennifer in a special appearance

Production
Eminent Malayalam novelist S. Kishore made his directorial debut with the romantic thriller film Kumari Pennin Ullathile under the banner of Visak Movies. S. Kishore who also the producer of the film and played the role of the main villain. The child artiste-turned-hero and aeronautical engineering graduate Chandrahassan Jayaprakash was chosen to play the lead role while Sippy from Kerala who played the second heroine in Naai Kutty (2009) was selected to play the heroine. Speaking of the film, director S. Kishore said, "I am a fan of M. G. Ramachandran. Kumari Pennin Ullathile is my favourite song. Also it goes with the theme of the movie".

Soundtrack

The film score and the soundtrack were composed by Amudha Bharathi. The soundtrack, released in 2010, features 5 tracks with lyrics written by Yugabharathi and Amudha Bharathi.

References

2010 films
2010s Tamil-language films
Indian romantic thriller films
2010s romantic thriller films